Sky Pilot Mountain is a mountain in British Columbia in Canada. The mountain, and Sky Pilot Rock near Desolation Sound are named for the United Church's mission boat Sky Pilot.

Climate
Based on the Köppen climate classification, Sky Pilot is located in the marine west coast climate zone of western North America. Most weather fronts originate in the Pacific Ocean, and travel east toward the Coast Mountains where they are forced upward by the range (Orographic lift), causing them to drop their moisture in the form of rain or snowfall. As a result, the Coast Mountains experience high precipitation, especially during the winter months in the form of snowfall. The months July through September offer the most favorable weather for climbing Sky Pilot.

References

Two-thousanders of British Columbia
New Westminster Land District